Piromidic acid is a quinolone antibiotic.

References

Quinolone antibiotics
Pyridopyrimidines
Pyrrolidines
Carboxylic acids